Kyllinia is a genus of small, predatory sea snails, marine gastropod mollusks in the family Mangeliidae.

Species
Species within the genus Kyllinia include:
 Kyllinia marchadi (Knudsen, 1956)
  † Kyllinia parentalis Garilli & Galletti, 2007

References

 Garilli V. & Galletti L. 2007. Kyllinia parentalis (Neogastropoda: Turridae), new genus and species from the Plio–Pleistocene of the Central Mediterranean area. Journal of Paleontology, 81(4): 746-753

External links
 Worldwide Mollusc Species Data Base: Mangeliidae